is a Japanese manga written and illustrated by .

Description
Terrarium In Drawer is a collection of short stories detailing the lives of multiple unrelated characters, with a new story almost every chapter. The manga's tone ranges from fantastical ("Wrath of the Dragon"), to conceptual ("Eating Symbols"), to everyday ("Sense of Scale"). The manga examines each of its highly fictional situations with a realistic lens, giving it a sense of authenticity that is seen in Kui's other work, Dungeon Meshi.

Reception
It won an Excellence Award for manga at the 17th Japan Media Arts Festival Awards. It was number seven on the 2014 Kono Manga ga Sugoi! Top 20 Manga for Male Readers survey. It was nominated for the 7th Manga Taishō, receiving 54 points and placing 5th among the ten nominees.

See also
Dungeon Meshi, another manga by the same author.

References

Comedy anime and manga
Fantasy anime and manga